The St. Ives Times and Echo is an independent, weekly local newspaper based in St Ives, Cornwall, England, United Kingdom.

History
The modern St. Ives Times & Echo is the result of a number of incorporations culminating with the amalgamation of The Western Echo  (founded in 1899 by William J. Jacobs) and The St. Ives Times  (founded in 1910 by Martin Osbourne Clock) amalgamated in 1957. The St Ives Printing and Publishing Company that owns the newspaper also prints the newspaper itself, as well as printing and publishing and books on art and the environment.

Circulation and content
Published every Friday, its circulation covers the St. Ives Bay Area and is intensive in the old Borough area of St Ives which encompasses Carbis Bay, Halsetown, St. Erth and Lelant. In Hayle, the newspaper is published under its own banner of The Hayle Times with identical content. It covers mainly local news with some national and occasionally international news items, particularly art related, which have local interest or appeal. Its current proprietor and editor is Toni Carver.

Printing
The St Ives Times and Echo prints on recycled sc mechanical paper (since the 1960s), instead of the more normal newsprint, as well as printing photographs (black & white only) to a higher resolution than is normal for a newspaper. It has advertisements on its front page (the Cornish & Devon Post also does this), and it prints in  ISO SRA 3 page format (bigger than tabloid but smaller than broadsheet). The main office is in the High Street in St Ives.

References

External links
St. Ives Times and Echo website

Companies based in Cornwall
Newspapers published in Cornwall
Weekly newspapers published in the United Kingdom
Publications established in 1899
St Ives, Cornwall